Christian Wichert (born. May 10, 1987) is a German professional ice hockey forward who is currently an Unrestricted Free Agent. He most recently played for EHC München of the Deutsche Eishockey Liga (DEL).

External links

1987 births
Augsburger Panther players
EHC München players
Iserlohn Roosters players
Living people
German ice hockey forwards